The  is a Japanese train type on order for use on Yakumo limited express services on the Sanyo Main Line, Hakubi Line and Sanin Main Line. Announced on 16 February 2022, it is intended to replace the 381 series.

Design 
Cars will be painted in a bronze livery. The trains will also feature a tilting system which will be an improvement over the current 381 series trainsets. The tilting system will be jointly developed by JR West, the Railway Technical Research Institute, and Kawasaki.

Each train set will consist of four cars. Green (first class) cars will feature transverse seating in a 1+2 configuration. Ordinary class cars will also feature transverse seating except in a 2+2 configuration. In addition to the regular seating arrangement, there will be a section reserved for tables.

History 
On 16 February 2022, JR West announced that it would be introducing a new type of rolling stock on Yakumo services in Spring 2024. Kinki Sharyo announced it would be responsible for manufacturing the trainsets on 7 March 2022.

References

External links 

 Press release (in Japanese)

Train-related introductions in 2024
West Japan Railway Company
Electric multiple units of Japan
Kawasaki multiple units
Kinki Sharyo multiple units
Tilting trains